Acheral is a settlement in Tucumán Province in the Monteros Department in northern Argentina in proximity to the Pre-Cordilleras of the Andes. It is accessed from the provincial capital city by Ruta Nacional 38 to the south.

It is a rural community with 7,000 inhabitants.

History 

On 30 May 1974 the Ramón Rosa Jiménez Company of the People's Revolutionary Army successfully "invaded" the village of Acheral and raised the first ERP flag.

On 10 October 1975, a skirmish between ERP guerrillas and the Argentine Army took place in Arroyo San Gabriel, 2 km north of Acheral. Army Aviation helicopters strafed the guerrillas' hideout and used their air-to-surface rockets to set it on fire, resulting in the deaths of one soldier and 13 guerrillas. One army helicopter was damaged during the incident.

References

Populated places in Tucumán Province